Seto Bagh (translation: White Tiger) is a 2015 Nepali historical film directed by Neer Shah. The cast includes BS Rana, Rajaram Poudel, Rabi Giri, Shyam Rai and Anjana Kattel. This movie is based on a historical novel of the same name written by one of the prominent Nepalese novelists Diamond Shumsher Rana. Seto Bagh is set during the last days of Jung Bahadur Rana following his death and then the start of conspiracies within the Rana family with the motive of accessing the power to rule.It shows the history of the country and how they fought so bravely.

Cast
 BS Rana
 Rajaram Poudel
 Rabi Giri
 Shyam Rai
 Anjana Kattel

See also

Diamond Shumsher Rana
Cinema of Nepal
List of Nepalese films

References

2015 films
2010s Nepali-language films
Films based on Nepalese novels
Films about Jung Bahadur Rana
Nepalese films based on actual events
Nepalese historical films
2010s historical films